The 1997 Ohio Bobcats football team was an American football team that represented Ohio University in the Mid-American Conference (MAC) during the 1997 NCAA Division I-A football season. In their third season under head coach Jim Grobe, the Bobcats compiled an 8–3 record (6–2 against MAC opponents), finished in a tie for second place in the MAC's East Division, and outscored all opponents by a combined total of 301 to 177.  They played their home games in Peden Stadium in Athens, Ohio.

The team's statistical leaders included Kareem Wilson with 369 passing yards, Steve Hookfin with 864 rushing yards, and Damion Maxwell with 180 receiving yards.

Schedule

References

Ohio
Ohio Bobcats football seasons
Ohio Bobcats football